Sri Atmananda Memorial School refers to two schools:

 Sri Atmananda Memorial School (Malakkara, Kerala), India
 Sri Atmananda Memorial School (Austin, Texas), USA (now closed)